Notre Dame Catholic Secondary School is a coeducational Catholic high school in Burlington, Ontario Canada. It was founded in 1989 by the Halton Catholic District School Board and enrols students from the 9th to 12th grades. However, many grade 12 graduates return for an optional 5th year of secondary school. 

Notre Dame is home to Extended French and 5 Specialist High Skills Major (SHSM) programs in Business Leadership, Green Industries, Computer Engineering, Culinary Arts, and Manufacturing. It is also a hub for STEAM (Science, Technology, Engineering, Arts, and Mathematics). Its students compete annually in mock trials, model UN, School REACH, Euclid Math, Halton Skills, and many more local and provincial academic events. Notre Dame promotes and supports all post-secondary pathways—university, college, apprenticeship, and workplace. 

The school community hosts an annual Arts Night, School Play, Business Leadership Conference, and most recently a STEAM Conference. There are plenty of clubs and activities for students to participate in as well as Student Council, Prefect, Physical Education Leadership, Business Leadership, and STEAM sponsored events. Students are also supported academically with after-school math help, a literacy course to assist with preparations for the OSSLT (Ontario Secondary School Literacy Test), credit rescue, and the L2L (Licence to Learn) student, peer tutoring initiative. 

Equity and inclusion and social justice programs include Best Buddies, MIH (Make it Happen), the annual Angel Campaign, Halton Food For Thought Breakfast Program, May-Giving, PINK Day in support of the Terry Fox Foundation, the ECO squad, the Social Justice student activists, and Irish Cares.

Health and wellness, bullying prevention and intervention, faith formation, parent engagement, student voice, social work, child and youth counselling, and an active Catholic School Council of parents are also a large part of the Notre Dame ethos.

School Population
Notre Dame’s enrolment has experienced a renewal since September 2017, increasing in size from the mid 900s to just over 1,100 students in 2019-20. It receives most of its students from local elementary schools including St. Gabriel, St. Timothy, St. Mark, and Canadian Martyrs.

Notre Dame, like all publicly funded Catholic schools in Ontario, also accepts non-Catholics into the school; however, they are expected to take part in the religious activities and religious classes.

The Catholic school's parishes are St. Gabriel and St. Paul the Apostle. It belongs to the Diocese of Hamilton, under His Excellency Bishop Crosby.

Athletics
Notre Dame competes in the Halton Catholic Athletic Association (HCAA). The HCAA is 1 of 3 athletic associations under the Golden Horseshoe Athletic Conference (GHAC), which in turn is itself 1 of 18 regional associations under the Ontario Federation of School Athletic Associations (OFSAA).

Over the past several years, a few teams have placed in the top three at OFSAA (the Ontario Provincial Championships), including the cross-country team, field hockey team, varsity girls' ice hockey team, swim team, and girls' soccer team, lacrosse team, girls’ rugby team, and track and field team. The girls' basketball team were OFSAA champions in 2016 and bronze medalists in 2017. The girls soccer team were OFSAA champions in 2019. 

The current 2019-20 school year continues to build on the school’s athletic resurgence with HCAA championship victories in senior field hockey, junior football, boys and girls swim teams and varsity girls’ hockey team. The girls varsity hockey team are also GHAC champions, moving onto OFSAA. The swim team left OFSAA with 1 gold and 1 silver medal.

There is an annual athletic banquet held in mid June which honours the MVPs and best athletes of the year from every sport and grade. Approximately 500 students, parents and staff attend the event, which is well known throughout the school for its video montage commemorating the year’s athletic achievements.

Notre Dame also offers the annual March Madness Basketball Camp and Summer Sports Camp (July) for elementary aged students, grades 1-8. The camps are open to students in both the Catholic and Public school systems.

Kilt Krew
Notre Dame has a group of male senior students referred to as "The Kilt Krew". They are a group that attends many sporting events that Notre Dame is involved in, to encourage students to cheer on the team. They are led by a student dubbed "Speedo Man" who can often be seen running across the field in a green speedo at half-time or pre-game. A new "Speedo Man" is generally selected every year by the previous years Speedo Man.

Sports, The Arts and School Clubs

Sports Teams

The Arts, Clubs and Co-Curricular Activities
Anime Club
AP French Language Exam Prep
Art Club
Arts Night and Buskerfest
HFFT Breakfast Program
Black History Month
Business Leadership Conference
Business Leadership Shamrock Shop
Careers Day Fair
CATHOLIC EDUCATION WEEK
Chess Club
Climate Change Conference - STEAM
Cooperative Education 
Culture of Life
DECA Notre Dame Chapter
DELF Language Certification
Drama Club
Environmental Club
Fishing Club
Health and Wellness Conference - STEAM
Health and Wellness Week
Here Come the Irish Pathways Excursions  
Holocaust Memorial
InsideND Electronic Newspaper monthly publication
International Women’s Conference 
Knights of Columbus BBQ and Open House
Math Help
Math Contests (CEMC)
Mental Health Awareness Action Team
Make It Happen (MIH)
Model UN
Licence to Learn (L2L) Peer Tutoring
Men as Career Coaches - HIEC
Mock Trials
Outdoor Education Algonquin Excursion
Photography
Prefect Program
School REACH Team
Religious Retreats
Remembrance Day Commemoration
School Electronic Newspaper (InsideND)
School Play
Social Justice Activists
SHSM Programs
STEAM Club and Leadership Initiatives
Student Athletic Association (SAA)
Student Council
Student Senate
Yearbook Course and Club
Yellow Bench Friendship Campaign - Raising Awareness about Youth Mental Health 
Waterloo University Electric Vehicle Challenge
Weight-Training 
Women as Career Coaches - HIEC
Source:

Fundraising Events/ Programs
Angel Campaign (Christmas Season)
Buckets
Blue Shirt Day in support of Bullying Prevention
Business Leadership Sponsored Sales
Charity of Hope
COBS Bakery
Coat for Kids Drive
Construction Technology Charcuterie/Live Edge
Elementary March Madness Basketball Camp
Elementary School Summer Sports Camp
Floodlight Football 
Green Industries/Horticulture Community Gardens
Habitat for Humanity CATCH18
Halton Catholic Children’s Education Fund - HCCEF
Irish Cares
Joe Luciani Memorial Football Game
May-Giving Food Drive
Mental Health Awareness
New 2 You Pre-Owned Uniform Sales
Notre Dame Spirit Wear Sales
Orange Shirt Day in support of Truth and Reconciliation - “Every Child Matters”
Pink Day Terry Fox Foundation Fight Against Cancer
Purple Shirt Day in support of Diversity and LGBTQ
Right to Play Soccer Tournament 
Sports Marketing Sponsored Tournaments
Student Council Sponsored Events
Trivia Night 
United Way Campaign Paint the Town Red Day
World Down syndrome Day
Winch Group Sports Equipment Drive to support the Indigenous Community in the North

Options may vary depending on staff availability, the continued participation of other schools, and the success of the activity the previous year.

Academics
Notre Dame has a wide array of courses in many different areas of interest. Students with a 79.5 percent overall average or above are recognized by being placed on the school's Honour Roll. Students with the highest average in a course and students who have the highest overall averages of each grade are also recognized.

Staff
There are currently 70+ full-time teachers and 100+ total staff employed at Notre Dame. The Principal is Anthony Cordeiro and the two vice-principals are Joanne DeSantis and Shari Typer. The Principal’s Administrative Assistant is Anna Butrym and the Financial Clerk is Ida Power. The school Chaplaincy lead is Chaplain Wayne. 

There are 10 Department Heads who serve on Academic Council. The Health and Physical Education DH and Athletics Director of Programming and Elementary School Camps is David Montoya. The school Social Worker is Claire Peace and the Child and You Counsellor is Nicole Pietroiusti.

Past Administration
 Peter Visser, Principal, 1987–1997
 Art Kelly, Principal, 1997-1998
 Paul Thompson, Principal, 1998–2005
 Stanley Gajewski, Principal, 2005–2008
 Thomas Dunn, Principal, 2008–2010
 Michael Iannetta, Principal 2010-2013
 Cairine MacDonald, Principal 2013–2017
 Anthony Cordeiro, Principal 2017–present

See also
List of high schools in Ontario

References

External links
Notre Dame Catholic Secondary School Website
Halton Catholic District School Board Website

High schools in Burlington, Ontario
Educational institutions established in 1989
Catholic secondary schools in Ontario
1989 establishments in Ontario